Ray Lane (born February 9, 1930) is an American sportscaster from Detroit, Michigan. During the late 1940s, Ray played baseball and basketball for the Stags of Mackenzie High School. In 1949, he enrolled at Michigan State University and played baseball for the Spartans while earning a bachelor's degree in communications.

Broadcasting
From 1967 through 1972 Lane teamed with Ernie Harwell on Detroit Tigers radio broadcasts; he also worked on the team's television broadcasts from 1999–2003.  Lane has also broadcast at various times for the Detroit Lions, Detroit Pistons, Detroit Red Wings, University of Michigan and Michigan State football and University of Detroit basketball.  Lane was also sports director at WJBK television (succeeding Van Patrick) and later at WKBD.

Outside of Michigan, Lane's other works include a stint with the Cincinnati Reds as well as Big Ten football and basketball.

Honors
Lane is a member of Lambda Chi Alpha fraternity, was named Michigan Sportscaster of the Year by the National Sportscasters and Sportswriters Association in 1969 and 1980, inducted into the Michigan Sports Hall of Fame in 1997, and is a past president and lifetime member of the Detroit Sports Media Association, which presented him with the Ty Tyson Award for Excellence in Sports Broadcasting in 2003 and the Ernie Harwell Lifetime Contribution Award in 2014. Lane has also been involved with the Michigan PGA Hall of Fame.

More recently, Michigan governor Jennifer Granholm declared October 3, 2009 as Ray Lane Day throughout the state.

Fundraisers
Lane has been a member of the Corporate Leadership Board of the Boys and Girls Clubs of Metro Detroit since 1972.  He has also been an active fundraiser for the United Foundation and the Sanctuary in Royal Oak, MI. Lane is the father of St. Louis television anchor Deanne Lane.

References 

1931 births
Living people
American sports announcers
Cincinnati Reds announcers
College basketball announcers in the United States
College football announcers
Detroit Lions announcers
Detroit Pistons announcers
Detroit Red Wings announcers
Detroit Tigers announcers
Major League Baseball broadcasters
Michigan State Spartans baseball players
Michigan State University alumni
National Basketball Association broadcasters
National Football League announcers
National Hockey League broadcasters
Sportspeople from Detroit
Television in Detroit
University of Detroit Mercy
Mackenzie High School (Michigan) alumni